Oisin Gallagher (born 2 December 2004) is a professional footballer who plays as a central midfielder for Barwell on loan from Lincoln City. Born in Northern Ireland, he represents the Republic of Ireland national under-19 team.

Club career

Lincoln City
Gallagher signed his first professional contract with Lincoln City on 3 December 2021. He made his Lincoln City debut against Barnsley in the EFL Trophy on 30 August 2022. He signed a new long-term contract on 1 February 2023. On 4 February 2023, he joined Barwell on a youth loan alongside team mate Julian Donnery.

Career statistics

References 

2004 births
Living people
Sportspeople from Derry (city)
Republic of Ireland association footballers
Republic of Ireland youth international footballers
Republic of Ireland international footballers from Northern Ireland
Association footballers from Northern Ireland
Association football forwards
Lincoln City F.C. players
Barwell F.C. players